Pustovoitova is a surname. Notable persons with that name include:

Anastasia Pustovoitova (born 1981), Russian footballer
Daria Pustovoitova (born 1994), Russian chess player

Russian-language surnames